The 2012 Reading Express season was the seventh season as a professional indoor football franchise and their second in the Indoor Football League (IFL). One of 16 teams competing in the IFL for the 2012 season, the Reading Express were members of the United Conference.

The team played their home games under head coach Mark Steinmeyer at the Sovereign Center in Reading, Pennsylvania. The Express earned a 2–12 record, placing 8th in the United Conference, failing to qualify for the postseason.

Schedule
Key:

Regular season
All start times are local to home team

Roster

Division Standings

References

Reading Express
Reading Express seasons
Reading Express